Ercole de Maria (? – c. 1640) was an Italian painter of the Baroque period, active mainly in Bologna. He was a pupil of the painter Guido Reni. He was also known as Ercolino di Guido. He was awarded a knighthood by Urban VIII, but died young.

References

1640s deaths
17th-century Italian painters
Italian male painters
Painters from Bologna
Italian Baroque painters
Year of birth unknown